The Archdeacon of Exeter is a senior ecclesiastical officer of the Diocese of Exeter in the Church of England. The modern diocese is divided into four archdeaconries: the archdeacon of Exeter supervises clergy and buildings within the area of the Archdeaconry of Exeter.

History
The first recorded archdeacon of Exeter occurs in 1083, around the time when archdeacons were first appointed in Britain. Around that time, the Diocese of Exeter was divided into four archdeaconries: Exeter, Cornwall, Totnes (or Totton) and Barnstaple (or Barum). This configuration of archdeaconries within the diocese remained for almost 800 years, until the creation of the independent Diocese of Truro from the Cornwall archdeaconry. On 22 March 1918, the archdeaconries were reconfigured and the Archdeaconry of Plymouth created from Totnes archdeaconry. Presently, the diocese operates an informal 'area scheme' such that responsibility for roughly half the diocese is delegated to each suffragan bishop: special oversight is given to the Bishop of Crediton for the Barnstaple and Exeter archdeaconries and to the Bishop of Plymouth for the Plymouth and Totnes archdeaconries.

List of archdeacons

High medieval
Sole (or primary) archdeacons of the diocese
?–28 June 1083 (d.): Odo
?–11 March 1104 (d.): Rolamnus
aft. 1103–11 August 1107 (res.): William Warelwast
During (or possibly before) the episcopacy of William Warelwast (1107–1137), the other three archdeaconries were instituted.
Archdeacons of Exeter
Ernaldus (died 14 March 1136)
bef. 1113–18 December 1138 (res.): Robert Warelwast
bef. 1143–aft. 1143: Walter de Constantiis
bef. –aft. : Henry Fitzharding
?–17 February 1155 (d.): Ralph
1155–1161 (res.): Bartholomew Iscanus
Baldwin of Forde, Archdeacon of Totnes was said in 1165 to have held this post.
bef. 1205–1221 (d.): Henry Fitz Robert de Molesiis/de Melvile
?–December 1225 (res.): Serlo
aft. 1225–bef. 1236: Bonus
bef. 1236–21 September 1247 (d.): Bartholomew
bef. 1269–1269 (res.): Roger de Thoriz
3 September 1270 – 1274 (res.): John Norilis/Norle
22 December 1274 – 1282 (res.): John of Pontoise
bef. 1284–aft. 1287: Robert de Evesham
bef. 1290–aft. 1292: Peter de Insula (later Archdeacon of Wells)
bef. 1295–bef. 1311: Bartholomew de Sancto Laurentio (also Archdeacon of Barnstaple; Dean of Exeter from 1310)

Late medieval
10 March 1308–? (deprived): Richard de Plumstok/de Plumpstock (unsuccessful royal grant)
20 June 1311–bef. 1312 (d.): William FitzRogo
5 March 1312 – 1317 (res.): John Wele
16 August 1317 – 2 February 1318 (deprived): Richard de Coleton (collation reversed)
2 February 1318–bef. 1318 (d.): Richard de Morcester
11 June 1318–bef. 1329 (d.): Thomas de Hereward
29 November 1329 – 1330 (res.): John de Northwode
18 April–5 July 1330 (d.): William de Grandisson/Grandison
12 July 1330 – June 1331 (exch.): William Zouche
June 1331–bef. 1345 (res.): Thomas de Nassington
15 December 1345–bef. 1360 (d.): Otto/Otho de Northwode
16 November–27 December 1360 (res.): Philip de Beauchamp/de Bello Campo (underage)
27 December 1360 – 1361 (res.): Stephen de Pempel/de Penpel/de Pympel
1361–1371 (d.): Philip de Beauchamp (again)
20 August 1371 – 1 March 1375 (deprived): Thomas de Swaby/Swaby (royal grant; revoked)
1 March 1371 – 1378 (deprived): Peter Cardinal de Vernhio (Peter de Everino; cardinal-deacon of Santa Maria in Via Lata)
10 July 1379–aft. 1379: John Cheyne
bef. 1384–16 August 1397 (d.): Philip Cardinal de Alencon (Philippe Valois d'Alençon, cardinal-bishop of Sabina)
8 November 1397–bef. 1399: William Waltham
9 April 1399–bef. 1399 (res.): Nicholas Bubwith
21 October 1399 – 1403 (res.): Walter Cook
11 June 1403 – 31 May 1408 (d.): Angelo Cardinal Acciaioli (Cardinal-bishop of Ostia)

7 December 1408 – 28 February 1410 (exch.): William Pilton/Thomas Pylton
–14 July 1410 (res.): Anthony Cardinal de Calvis (Antonio Calvi, cardinal-priest of San Marco; unsuccessful papal grant)
28 February 1410 – 1417 (res.): Thomas Hendeman
25 January–May 1417 (res.): Roger Bolter
21 September 1417–bef. 1425 (d.): John Schute
1418: Thomas Redman (ineffective exchange)
27 September 1425–bef. 1438 (d.): James Carslegh
5 December 1438–bef. 1444 (res.): Peter Stukeley/Stukelegh
21 March 1444 – 1453 (d.): John Druell
8 June 1453 – 7 January 1475 (exch.): Peter Courtenay
7 January 1475 – 23 October 1482 (d.): Robert Aiscough/Ayscogh
aft. 1482–1492 (d.): David Hopton
3 February 1492– (res.): Richard Nykke
bef. 1504 – November 1504 (res.): Hugh Oldham
13 January 1505 – 1515 (res.): Richard More
19 June 1515–bef. 1519 (d.): John Fulford
19 January 1519 – 27 December 1555 (d.): Adam Travesse

Early modern
1551–?: Rowland Taylor (burned at the stake, 1555)
30 January 1556–bef. 1569 (res.): George Carew
20 October 1569–bef. 1583 (d.): Robert Fisher/Fysher
14 January 1583 – 25 November 1633 (d.): Thomas Barrett
16 January 1634–bef. 1643 (d.): Aaron Wilson
21 September 1643–bef. 1662 (res.): Edward Young
18 August 1662–bef. 1665 (res.): Robert Cary
4 February 1665 – 28 March 1668 (d.): Daniel Estcott
28 March 1668 – September 1676 (res.): Anthony Sparrow, Bishop of Exeter
24 October 1676 – 1 February 1704 (d.): Edward Lake
1 April 1704 – 1707 (res.): Jonathan Trelawny, Bishop of Exeter
7 February 1708 – 29 November 1716 (d.): Ofspring Blackall, Bishop of Exeter
1 March 1717 – 21 October 1726 (d.): Edward Trelawney
11 November 1726–bef. 1732: Richard Ibbetson
26 January 1732 – 1820: successive Bishops of Exeter held the archdeaconry for this period
29 December 1820 – 1865 (d.): John Moore-Stevens (Moore-Stevens after July 1832)

Late modern
April 1865 – February 1875 (d.): Philip Freeman
February 1875 – 1888 (d.): Henry Sanders
1888–1909 (ret.): Ernest Sandford
1909–1924 (ret.): Frederick Sanders
1925–1930 (res.): William Surtees
1930–17 April 1951 (d.): Huxley Thompson
1951–1958 (res.): Wilfrid Westall (also Bishop suffragan of Crediton from 1954)
1958–1970 (ret.): Richard Babington (afterwards archdeacon emeritus)
1981–1994 (res.): John Richards
1994–2002 (ret.): Tony Tremlett
2003–2005 (res.): Paul Gardner
2006–2012 (res.): Penny Driver
28 April 20127 September 2019 (res.): Christopher Futcher (became Archdeacon in Cyprus)
25 September 2019present: Andrew Beane

References

Sources

 

Lists of Anglicans
 
Archdeacon of Exeter